The Korean Federation of Literature and Arts, (KFLA; , abbreviated as , "Mun-ye-chong") is an organizational group of artists in North Korea. It was founded as the North Korean Arts Alliance on March 25, 1946,

Function 
As a representative arts federation of North Korea, it serves as a unified organization that oversees literary activities in all fields. The federation belongs to the Propaganda and Agitation Department of the Central Committee of the Workers' Party of Korea (WPK).

Their main task is to instill the ideology of the WPK in the literature and arts. To do this, artists receive ideology education and guidance in creative works. Writers and artists of North Korea are obligated to join the KFLA and its affiliated alliances.

As one of the main extra-governmental organizations of the WPK and having the power to appoint or even expel, artists, the federation is considered as one with great influence. For example, the North Korean Ministry of Culture and Arts and the KFLA have joint control over the literary field. Their affiliations independently issue bulletins.

History 
This federation was previously called the North Korean Arts Alliance, initiated in Pyongyang on March 25, 1946. Before then, communist artists were also active in the United States Army Military Government regions of Seoul, and formed their own group. The Pyeongnam Professional Alliance, led by Ri Ki-yong and Han Sorya, was a regional group formed in the Soviet army government areas.

With the fixation of the division, the Pyeongnam Professional Alliance merged with Pyongyang Arts & Culture Association which claimed to promote pure arts, expanding into a nationwide organization with a new name, the North Korean Arts Alliance. In October of the same year, the organization expanded yet again into the North Korean Federation of Literature and Arts (NKFLA), with seven divided affiliations in: literature, music, art, drama, film, dance and photography.

After the Korean War, pro-communist artists in Seoul who went to the North were integrated into the group, and in 1951, its current name, the Korean Federation of Literature and Arts, was given. At that time, there was an influx of a line from the Workers' Party of South Korea, and their great purge in 1953 influenced the National Artists' Art Competition, greatly reducing the number of members. All other groups were dissolved, leaving only the Korean Writers' Alliance, Korean Artists' Alliance, and Korean Composers' Alliance.

The current federation was reorganized in March of 1961, after clearing the purge of the South Chosun Worker's Party. The previously divided seven affiliations: Korean Writers' Alliance, Korean Musicians' Alliance, Korean Artists' Alliance, Korean Dancers' Alliance, Korean Theater Alliance, Korean Film Alliance, Korean Photography Alliance, and Korean Composers' Alliance were added on in the 1970s.

See also

Choson Yesul, official magazine of the Federation
Culture of North Korea
Korean art
North Korean literature

References

Bibliography 
김, 성민 (2002). 북한문학의 이해. 국학자료원. 

1946 establishments in North Korea
Arts in North Korea
Art in North Korea